Pedioplanis huntleyi is a species of lizard in the family Lacertidae. The species is endemic to Angola.

Etymology
The specific name, huntleyi, is in honor of Brian Huntley who was chief executive officer of the South African National Biodiversity Institute.

Geographic range
P. huntleyi is found in southwestern Angola in Cunene and Namibe Provinces.

Habitat
The natural habitats of P. huntleyi are rocky areas, shrubland, and woodland.

References

Further reading
Conradie W, Measey GJ, Branch WR, Tolley KA (2012). "Revised phylogeny of African sand lizards (Pedioplanis), with description of two new species from south-western Angola". African Journal of Herpetology 61 (2): 91–112. (Pedioplanis huntleyi, new species).
Marques MP, Ceríaco LMP, Blackburn DC,  (2018). "Diversity and Distribution of the Amphibians and Terrestrial Reptiles of Angola: Atlas of Historical and Bibliographic Records (1840–2017)". Proceedings of the California Academy of Sciences, Fourth Series 65: 1–501. (Supplement II).

Pedioplanis
Lacertid lizards of Africa
Reptiles of Angola
Endemic fauna of Angola
Reptiles described in 2012
Taxa named by Werner Conradie
Taxa named by G. John Measey
Taxa named by William Roy Branch
Taxa named by Krystal A. Tolley